The surname "de Castro" may refer to:

Various members of the de Castro family (Sephardi Jewish)
Various members of the de Castro family (Anza Expedition)

See also
 Castro (surname)
 House of Castro
 Duchy of Castro
 Duke of Castro (disambiguation)
 Castro (disambiguation)